Albertirsa (formerly Alberti-Irsa) is a town in Ceglédi kistérség, Pest megye, and the middle of the Great Hungarian Plain.

History 
Initially Albertirsa was two separate inhabitations: Alberti and Irsa, having joined in 1950.

 1277: King Ladislaus IV mentions the name of Alberti (as Alberth) tenure in one of his charters
 1368: The chapter of Buda mentions Irsa (from Slavic *jelsa) as an inhabitation
 1597: Both villages got emptied after the 1241 Mongol invasion and the Ottoman conquest in the 16th century
 September 29, 1711: Local landlord András Váracskay brings settlers to populate the grassland of Alberti-Irsa. 24 chariots of Slovak settlers arrive to Alberti
 1714: Royal endowment letter grants the ownership of Alberti to Márton Szeleczky
 1719: András Irsay has one third of Irsa of Pest shire
 1731: Beginning of mandatory lecturing for commons in local landlord funded school
 1784: Descendants of Márton Szeleczky attain the rights for Alberti to hold markets. This right also grants the market town title.
 September 1, 1847: First train arrives
 1848: Hundreds joining to the 1848 Revolution after the recruitment speech of Kossuth at Cegléd
 1924: Civil School of Irsa founded
 September 6, 1950: The two villages Alberti and Irsa are joined under the name of Albertirsa by an ordinance of the Ministry for Home Affairs
 1979: Inauguration of Hungary's first 750 kV substation south of Albertirsa
 1995: Gerje-Party Association founded
 1996: Inauguration of the new flag and symbol during the millennium festival
 July 1, 2003: town status granted to Albertirsa, which has 11547 inhabitants this time

Notable people 
 Róza Csillag (1832–1892), female Jewish singer
 Ádám Politzer (1835–1920), a Jewish otologist

Points of interest 
Near Albertirsa, there is the only 750 kV-substation in Hungary. At it, the 750 kV-powerline from Zakhidnoukrainska in Ukraine ends.

 Szeleczky-Szapáry Castle named after Szeleczky and Szapáry family
 Synagogue of Irsa
 Albertirsai Strand An outdoor bathing area with many pools for all ages along with small restaurants.

Twin towns – sister cities

Albertirsa is twinned with:
 Gaggiano, Italy (1992)
 Bourg-Saint-Andéol, France (1998)
 Malacky, Slovakia (2000)
 Șimleu Silvaniei, Romania (2004)
 Żnin, Poland (2005)

References

External links

  in Hungarian
 Google Maps satellite
 Official website of the Town of Żnin - twin town in Poland
 Aerialphotgraphs of Albertirsa

Populated places established in 1950
1950 establishments in Hungary
1277 establishments in Europe
Irsa
Populated places in Pest County
Shtetls
Irsa